Lake House is a lake in the extreme west end of Pearse Valley, north of Friis Hills in Victoria Land, Antarctica. It was named by the eighth Victoria University of Wellington Antarctic Expedition (VUWAE), 1963–64, for D.A. House, chemist and member of the VUWAE party that explored lakes in Taylor, Wright, and Victoria Valleys.

References 

House, Lake